Altan Aksoy (born 5 February 1976) was a Turkish footballer who last played as midfielder for Giresunspor.

Career
Born in Rize, Aksoy began playing football for Göztepe S.K. in 1994. He would play for Süper Lig sides İstanbulspor A.Ş., Adanaspor, Kocaelispor, Konyaspor, Galatasaray S.K., Çaykur Rizespor and Giresunspor.

References

External links
 

1976 births
Living people
Turkish footballers
Turkey international footballers
Turkey under-21 international footballers
Turkey youth international footballers
Göztepe S.K. footballers
İstanbulspor footballers
Adanaspor footballers
Kocaelispor footballers
Konyaspor footballers
Galatasaray S.K. footballers
Çaykur Rizespor footballers
Giresunspor footballers
Süper Lig players
Association football midfielders
Mediterranean Games silver medalists for Turkey
Competitors at the 1997 Mediterranean Games
Mediterranean Games medalists in football
Sportspeople from Rize